Plamen Tonev Iliev (born 4 February 1994 in Pleven) is a Bulgarian footballer currently playing as a winger for Spartak Pleven.

Career
Born in Pleven, Iliev began his career at his hometown club, Spartak Pleven.

In 2008, he joined Levski Sofia's Academy.

Career statistics

References

External links

1994 births
Living people
Bulgarian footballers
PFC Levski Sofia players
FC Botev Vratsa players
PFC Spartak Pleven players
FC Lokomotiv Gorna Oryahovitsa players
First Professional Football League (Bulgaria) players
Association football midfielders
Sportspeople from Pleven